The 2010 Netball Superleague Grand Final featured Team Bath and Hertfordshire Mavericks. Having previously played each other in the 2006, 2007 and  2008 grand finals, this was the fourth final that featured Team Bath and Mavericks. Just like the three previous encounters, it was Team Bath that emerged as winners.

Mavericks won the first quarter and remained competitive throughout the whole match. Towards the end of the second quarter, Pamela Cookey sank a shot that saw Team Bath take the lead for the first time. By half time Team Bath were leading 22–21 and at the three-quarter mark they led 36–33. However during the fourth quarter Mavericks drew level, with the scores at 37–37, before Team Bath pulled away to win by 51–44. The grand final was broadcast live on Sky Sports for the first time.

Route to the Final

Match summary

Teams

References

2009–10 Netball Superleague season
2008-09
Team Bath (netball) matches
Mavericks Netball matches
Netball Superleague